Nicholas Edward Anthony ("Nick") Bovell (born May 11, 1986) is an Olympic swimmer from Trinidad and Tobago. He is the younger brother of fellow Trinidad swimming Olympic George Bovell.

Bovell represented his native country at the:
2008 Olympics,
2003 World Championships,
2003 Pan American Games.

He was also to swim at the 2004 Olympics; however, he was injured at the time of the Games and was unable to compete.

References

1986 births
Living people
Trinidad and Tobago male swimmers
Pan American Games competitors for Trinidad and Tobago
Olympic swimmers of Trinidad and Tobago
Swimmers at the 2003 Pan American Games
Swimmers at the 2007 Pan American Games
Swimmers at the 2008 Summer Olympics
Trinidad and Tobago people of European descent
Central American and Caribbean Games bronze medalists for Trinidad and Tobago
Competitors at the 2006 Central American and Caribbean Games
Central American and Caribbean Games medalists in swimming